Roman Sakhno (born May 21, 1990) is a Ukrainian footballer playing with FC Vorkuta in the Canadian Soccer League.

Playing career

Ukraine 
Sakhno began his career in 2007 with FC Dnipro-75 Dnipropetrovsk in the Ukrainian Second League. In 2008, he signed with FC Kryvbas Kryvyi Rih in the country's top league the Ukrainian Premier League. After failing to make an appearance with Kryvbas he was transferred to Ukrainian First League to play with FC Naftovyk-Ukrnafta Okhtyrka. In 2012, he returned to play in the Second League with FC Hirnyk-Sport Komsomolsk, and with FC Makiyivvuhillya Makiivka in 2014.

He played with several amateur clubs from the Football Federation of Donetsk Oblast like MIC-Agro FC and Kolos Zachepilovka.

Canada 
In 2016, he went abroad to Canada to play with Toronto Atomic FC in the Canadian Soccer League, where in appeared in 11 matches and scored 1 goal. In 2017, he played indoor soccer with Ukraine AC in the Arena Premier League.

In 2020, he returned to the Canadian Soccer League to play with FC Vorkuta. In his debut season he featured in the CSL Championship final against Scarborough SC and assisted in securing the championship. In 2021, he assisted in securing Vorkuta's third regular season title.

Honors 
FC Vorkuta

 CSL Championship: 2020 
Canadian Soccer League Regular Season: 2021

References 

1990 births
Living people
Ukrainian footballers
FC Dnipro-75 Dnipropetrovsk players
FC Kryvbas Kryvyi Rih players
FC Naftovyk-Ukrnafta Okhtyrka players
FC Hirnyk Kryvyi Rih players
FC Makiyivvuhillya Makiyivka players
Toronto Atomic FC players
FC Continentals players
Canadian Soccer League (1998–present) players
Association football midfielders
Ukrainian First League players
Ukrainian Second League players
Footballers from Dnipro